Edward Klinik (21 July 1919 – 24 August 1942) was a Polish Roman Catholic anti-Nazi resistance fighter. One of the Poznań Five (Poznańska Piątka), he was guillotined in a prison in Dresden for his resistance work. He is one of the 108 Martyrs of World War II who were beatified by Pope John Paul II in 1999.

See also 
List of Nazi-German concentration camps
The Holocaust in Poland
World War II casualties of Poland

References

1919 births
1942 deaths
108 Blessed Polish Martyrs
Polish resistance members of World War II
People from Poznań
People executed by Nazi Germany by guillotine